Andrews Wildlife Management Area is located on the Suwannee River, five miles north of Chiefland in Levy County, Florida.

Fauna
The largest continuous tract of old-growth hardwood hammock forest in Florida exists within this 3,582 acre Wildlife Management Area (WMA). The old trees provide homes for flying squirrels, owls, and several bat species including Rafinesque's big-eared bat. North American river otters, Suwannee alligator snapping turtles, and many snake species utilize the cypress/tupelo swamps. Gulf sturgeon can often be seen leaping out of the water from the bank of the Suwannee River.

Recreational activities
Over ten miles of trails and unpaved roads traverse Andrews WMA. An interpretive boardwalk travels through a transition of habitats from upland forest to floodplain swamp. Andrews WMA is a site on the Great Florida Birding and Wildlife Trail.

Hunting is popular at this WMA due to robust wild turkey, white-tailed deer, and feral hog populations. Fishing can be productive in the Suwannee River, both from boats and from the shore.

References

External links
U.S. Geological Survey Map at the U.S. Geological Survey Map Website. Retrieved February 2, 2023.

Protected areas of Levy County, Florida
Wildlife management areas of Florida